Yusuph Mgwao (born 6 August 1988) is a retired Tanzanian football striker.

References

1988 births
Living people
Tanzanian footballers
Tanzania international footballers
Simba S.C. players
Moro United F.C. players
Mtibwa Sugar F.C. players
Ruvu Shooting F.C. players
African Lyon F.C. players
Friends Rangers F.C. players
Maji Maji F.C. players
Association football forwards
Tanzanian Premier League players